Pinon's imperial pigeon (Ducula pinon) is a species of bird in the family Columbidae. It is found in New Guinea. The species is named after Rose de Freycinet née Pinon. Several subspecies have been designated:

 Ducula pinon pinon (Quoy and Gaimard) - Western Papuan Islands; Aru Islands; southern New Guinea from the Mimika River to Hall Sound. 
 Ducula pinon rubiensis (A. B. Meyer) - Geelvink Bay, New Guinea to Eatna Bay 
 Ducula pinon jobiensis (Schlegel) - Jobi Island, northern coast of New Guinea; Dampier and Vulcan Islands.
 Ducula pinon salvadorii (Tristram) - D'Entrecasteaux Archipelago: Fergusson and Goodenough Islands; Louisiade Archipelago : St. Aignan, Rossel and Sudest Islands.
 

Its natural habitat is subtropical or tropical moist lowland forests.

References

Pinon's imperial pigeon
Birds of New Guinea
Pinon's imperial pigeon
Taxonomy articles created by Polbot